Ottmar Mergenthaler (11 May 1854 – 28 October 1899) was a German-American inventor who has been called a second Gutenberg, as Mergenthaler invented the linotype machine, the first device that could easily and quickly set complete lines of type for use in printing presses. This machine revolutionized the art of printing.

Life and career 
Mergenthaler was born into a German family in Hachtel, Kingdom of Württemberg. He was the third son of a school teacher, Johann Georg Mergenthaler, from Hohenacker near the city of  Waiblingen.

He was apprenticed to a watchmaker in Bietigheim before emigrating to the United States in 1872 to work with his cousin August Hahl in Washington, D.C. Mergenthaler eventually moved with Hahl's shop to Baltimore, Maryland. In 1878, Mergenthaler became a naturalized citizen of the United States. In 1881, Mergenthaler became Hahl's business partner.

Invention of the Linotype 

In 1876, Mergenthaler was approached by James O. Clephane and his associate Charles T. Moore, who sought a quicker way of publishing legal briefs. By 1884 he conceived the idea of assembling metallic letter molds, called matrices, and casting molten metal into them, all within a single machine. His first attempt proved the idea feasible, and a new company was formed. Always improving his invention, Mergenthaler further developed his idea of an independent matrix machine.

In July 1886, the first commercially used Linotype was installed in the printing office of the New York Tribune. Here it was immediately used on the daily paper and a large book. The book, the first ever composed with the new Linotype method, was titled, The Tribune Book of Open-Air Sports. Produced by his Mergenthaler Linotype Company, the machine remained a mainstay of the publishing industry until the 1980s.

Death 

Mergenthaler died of tuberculosis in Baltimore in 1899.

Legacy 

An operational Linotype machine is on display at the Baltimore Museum of Industry, in the museum's print shop. Baltimore's vocational high school, Mergenthaler Vocational Technical Senior High School, which opened in 1953, is named after him, although it is commonly referred to simply as "MERVO".

Mergenthaler Hall on the Homewood Campus of the Johns Hopkins University was constructed in 1940–41 with donations by Eugene and Mrs. Ottmar Mergenthaler, son and widow of Ottmar Mergenthaler.

See also 

List of German inventors and discoverers

References

External links 

 Baltimore History Site 
 Linotype – Chronik eines Firmennamens [Linotype – Chronologie of a Company Name]: ebook on the Linotype machine
 Overview of Mergenthaler's life
 
 
Ottmar Mergenthaler at 159 West Lanvale Street - Explore Baltimore Heritage

1854 births
1899 deaths
Burials at Loudon Park Cemetery
People from Bad Mergentheim
People from the Kingdom of Württemberg
People from Baltimore
German emigrants to the United States
19th-century deaths from tuberculosis
Tuberculosis deaths in Maryland
19th-century American inventors